John Noyes House is a historic home located at Starkey in Yates County, New York. It is a Greek Revival style structure built about 1840. 33 acres are historically associated with this property, including a barn and a smokehouse. The house is an example of a typical farmstead for the era.

It was listed on the National Register of Historic Places in 1994.

References

Houses on the National Register of Historic Places in New York (state)
Greek Revival houses in New York (state)
Houses completed in 1840
Houses in Yates County, New York
National Register of Historic Places in Yates County, New York